Antwerp is a locality in Victoria, Australia on the Dimboola – Rainbow Road, in the Shire of Hindmarsh,  north of Dimboola and  north-west of Melbourne.

History
Ellerman named the area after his birthplace, the Belgian city of Antwerp. In 1858 two Moravian missionaries, Reverend Friedrich Hagenauer and Reverend Spieseke, arrived in the area. By 1859 they had built a church, and in 1860 they baptised an Aborigine for the first time.

During the 1880s, the Eucalyptus Mallee Oil Company began operations in the township, distilling eucalyptus oil, which was sold under the brand name EMU. The eucalyptus oil business was responsible for the influx of people into the district.

Antwerp State School No. 3104 (originally named Antwerp South State School) opened circa 1891, with tenders called to relocate a building from Koonik Koonik in 1901 and additions in 1905. The building was condemned by the Shire of Dimboola in 1909 on health grounds due to overcrowding. The school was rebuilt, and continued operating until it was closed at the end of 1981 due to falling enrolments. The school buildings were removed from the site after closure.

The first "Antwerp" Post Office opened on 25 November 1891, but was renamed Antwerp North in March 1892 and then Tarranyurk in May 1895, which mirrored its location along the railway line. The new Antwerp Post Office opened at Antwerp township in March 1892 and closed in January 1990.

Antwerp railway station and sidings on the Dimboola to Jeparit railway line opened in June 1894. Passengers were carried on mixed goods/passenger trains pre-war (six days per week in 1928). The railway line was converted from broad to standard gauge in 1995.

The concrete "Geelong" silos for bulk grain handling and storage were built for the Grain Elevators Board of Victoria and opened for the 1939/40 harvest. The steel "ASCOM" silos were built in the late 1950s and the grain bunker area was constructed in the early 1980s.

A timber bridge was constructed across the river at Antwerp circa 1890. This bridge remained in service until replaced with a concrete bridge that was built parallel to it on the upstream side around 1990.

A timber weir was built across the Wimmera River in 1903 to provide a perennial water supply by regulating the river. Open channels were constructed across the landscape.

Social infrastructure reflected the larger population in the early years, which included a hall built in 1904, a Methodist church and sports facilities including an oval and tennis courts at a recreation reserve across the river. The locality previously had its own football, cricket, tennis and rowing clubs, with rowing regattas held on the Wimmera River.

Antwerp today
Today, the ruin of the Ebenezer Mission has been restored and is the localities tourist attraction. A downsized town remains with a few houses, the grain silos adjoining the railway line, the hall and the bridge with tennis courts across the other side. The Antwerp Tennis Club is still competing.

The grain facilities are not in use, and the railway siding is used to store surplus grain wagons.

References

External links

Towns in Victoria (Australia)
History of the Australia work of the Moravian Church
Wimmera